Body snatcher or The Body Snatcher may refer to:

 Body-snatcher, a person who secretly exhumes dead bodies to sell them

Books and film adaptations
"The Body Snatcher", 1885 short story by Robert Louis Stevenson
 The Body Snatcher (film), 1945 film adaptation of Stevenson's story
The Body Snatchers, 1955 novel by Jack Finney
 Invasion of the Body Snatchers, 1956 film adaptation of Finney's novel
 Invasion of the Body Snatchers (1978 film), remake of the 1956 film
 Body Snatchers (1993 film), film adaptation of Finney's novel
 The Invasion (film), 2007 film adaptation of Finney's novel
 The Bodysnatchers (novel), a Doctor Who novel
 Bodysnatcher (Red Dwarf), unused script for the science fiction comedy series Red Dwarf
 The Bodysnatcher Collection, a DVD release featuring several episodes of comedy series Red Dwarf

Music
Body Snatchers (Rare Essence album), 1996
Body Snatchers (Iron Lung Corp album), 2013
 "Bodysnatchers" (song), a song by Radiohead, from the album In Rainbows
 The Bodysnatchers (band), seven-piece all-women band involved in the British ska revival of the early 1980s

Other
 "The Body Snatcher", nickname of professional boxer Mike McCallum